Leonard George Garrett (14 May 1936 – 15 March 2011) was an English professional footballer and minor counties cricketer.

Garrett was born in Hackney. After playing for Eton Manor, he joined Arsenal in 1954, but did not feature for the club in any first team matches. He was sold to Ipswich Town for £200 in 1958, featuring in just one first team match for the club. He left Ipswich in 1961, joining Haverhill Rovers.

Garrett also played cricket at minor counties level for Suffolk, albeit intermittently, from 1960–73, making seven appearances in the Minor Counties Championship. He later emigrated to France, where he died in the Dordogne in March 2011.

References

1936 births
2011 deaths
Footballers from Hackney Central
English footballers
Association football fullbacks
Eton Manor F.C. players
Arsenal F.C. players
Ipswich Town F.C. players
Haverhill Rovers F.C.
English Football League players
English cricketers
Suffolk cricketers
English expatriates in France